Siah Mansur-e Olya (also Romanized as Sīāh Manşūr-e ‘Olya, Sīāh Manşūr-e ‘Olyā, and Seyāh Manşūr-e ‘Olyā; also known as Sīah Mansūr Bālā and Sīāh Manşūr-e Bālā) is a village in Vahdatiyeh Rural District, Sadabad District, Dashtestan County, Bushehr Province, Iran. At the 2006 census, its population was 42, in 11 families.

References 

Populated places in Dashtestan County